In Spain, music has a long history. It has played an important role in the development of Western music, and has greatly influenced Latin American music. Spanish music is often associated with traditional styles such as flamenco and classical guitar. While these forms of music are common, there are many different traditional musical and dance styles across the regions. For example, music from the north-west regions is heavily reliant on bagpipes, the jota is widespread in the centre and north of the country, and flamenco originated in the south. Spanish music played a notable part in the early developments of western classical music, from the 15th through the early 17th century. The breadth of musical innovation can be seen in composers like Tomás Luis de Victoria, styles like the zarzuela of Spanish opera, the ballet of Manuel de Falla, and the classical guitar music of Francisco Tárrega. Nowadays commercial pop music dominates.

Origins of the music of Spain

The Iberian peninsula has had a history of receiving different musical influences from around the Mediterranean Sea and across Europe. In the two centuries before the Christian era, Roman rule brought with it the music and ideas of Ancient Greece; early Christians, who had their own differing versions of church music arrived during the height of the Roman Empire; the Visigoths, a Romanized Germanic people, who took control of the peninsula following the fall of the Roman Empire; the Moors and Jews in the Middle Ages. Hence, there have been more than two thousand years of internal and external influences and developments that have produced a large number of unique musical traditions.

Medieval period

Isidore of Seville wrote about the local music in the 6th century. His influences were predominantly Greek, and yet he was an original thinker, and recorded some of the first details about the early music of the Christian church. He perhaps is most famous in musical history for declaring that it was not possible to notate sounds, an assertion which revealed his ignorance of the notational system of ancient Greece, suggesting that this knowledge had been lost with the fall of the Roman Empire in the west.

The Moors of Al-Andalus were usually relatively tolerant of Christianity and Judaism, especially during the first three centuries of their long presence in the Iberian peninsula, during which Christian and Jewish music continued to flourish. Music notation was developed in Spain as early as the 8th century (the so-called Visigothic neumes) to notate the chant and other sacred music of the Christian church, but this obscure notation has not yet been deciphered by scholars, and exists only in small fragments.  The music of the early medieval Christian church in Spain is known, misleadingly, as the "Mozarabic Chant", which developed in isolation prior to the Islamic invasion and was not subject to the Papacy's enforcement of the Gregorian chant as the standard around the time of Charlemagne, by which time the Muslim armies had conquered most of the Iberian peninsula. As the Christian reconquista progressed, these chants were almost entirely replaced by the Gregorian standard, once Rome had regained control of the Iberian churches. The style of Spanish popular songs of the time is presumed to have been heavily influenced by the music of the Moors, especially in the south, but as much of the country still spoke various Latin dialects while under Moorish rule (known today as the Mozarabic) earlier musical folk styles from the pre-Islamic period continued in the countryside where most of the population lived, in the same way as the Mozarabic Chant continued to flourish in the churches. In the royal Christian courts of the reconquistors, music like the Cantigas de Santa Maria, also reflected Moorish influences. Other important medieval sources include the Codex Calixtinus collection from Santiago de Compostela and the Codex Las Huelgas from Burgos. The so-called Llibre Vermell de Montserrat (red book) is an important devotional collection from the 14th century.

Renaissance and Baroque periods

In the early Renaissance, Mateo Flecha el Viejo and the Castilian dramatist Juan del Encina ranked among the main composers in the post-Ars Nova period. Renaissance song books included the Cancionero de Palacio, the Cancionero de Medinaceli, the Cancionero de Upsala (kept in Carolina Rediviva library), the Cancionero de la Colombina, and the later Cancionero de la Sablonara. The organist Antonio de Cabezón stands out for his keyboard compositions and mastery.

An early 16th-century polyphonic vocal style developed in Spain was closely related to that of the Franco-Flemish composers. Merging of these styles occurred during the period when the Holy Roman Empire and the Burgundy were part of the dominions under Charles I (king of Spain from 1516 to 1556), since composers from the North of Europe visited Spain, and native Spaniards traveled within the empire, which extended to the Netherlands, Germany and Italy. Music composed for the vihuela by Luis de Milán, Alonso Mudarra and Luis de Narváez was one of the main achievements of the period. The Aragonese Gaspar Sanz authored the first learning method for guitar. Spanish composers of the Renaissance included Francisco Guerrero, Cristóbal de Morales, and Tomás Luis de Victoria (late Renaissance period), all of whom spent a significant portion of their careers in Rome. The latter was said to have reached a level of polyphonic perfection and expressive intensity equal or even superior to Palestrina and Lassus . Most Spanish composers returned home from travels abroad late in their careers to spread their musical knowledge in their native land, or in the late 16th century to serve at the Court of Philip II.

18th to 20th centuries

By the end of the 17th century the "classical" musical culture of Spain was in decline, and was to remain that way until the 19th century.  Classicism in Spain, when it arrived, was inspired by Italian models, as in the works of Antonio Soler. Some outstanding Italian composers such as Domenico Scarlatti and Luigi Boccherini were appointed to the Madrid royal court. The short-lived Juan Crisóstomo Arriaga is credited as the main beginner of Romantic sinfonism in Spain. 

Although symphonic music was never too important in Spain, chamber, solo instrumental (mainly guitar and piano) vocal and opera (both traditional opera, and the Spanish version of the singspiel) music was written by local composers. Zarzuela, a native form of opera that includes spoken dialogue, is a secular musical genre which developed in the mid-17th century, flourishing most importantly in the century after 1850. Francisco Asenjo Barbieri was a key figure in the development of the romantic zarzuela; whilst later composers such as Ruperto Chapí, Federico Chueca and Tomás Bretón brought the genre to its late 19th-century apogee. Leading 20th-century zarzuela composers included Pablo Sorozábal and Federico Moreno Torroba.

Fernando Sor, Dionisio Aguado, Francisco Tárrega and Miguel Llobet are known as composers of guitar music. Fine literature for violin was created by Pablo Sarasate and Jesús de Monasterio.

Musical creativity mainly moved into areas of popular music until the nationalist revival of the late Romantic era. Spanish composers of this period included Felipe Pedrell, Isaac Albéniz, Enrique Granados, Joaquín Turina, Manuel de Falla, Jesús Guridi, Ernesto Halffter, Federico Mompou, Salvador Bacarisse, and Joaquín Rodrigo.

Performers

In the field of classical music, Spain has produced a number of noted singers and performers. In Spain there are over forty professional orchestras, including the Orquestra Simfònica de Barcelona, Orquesta Nacional de España and the Orquesta Sinfónica de Madrid. Major opera houses include the Teatro Real, the Gran Teatre del Liceu, Teatro Arriaga and the El Palau de les Arts Reina Sofía.

Ye-yé

From the English pop-refrain words "yeah-yeah", ye-yé was a French-coined term which Spanish language appropriated to refer to uptempo, "spirit lifting" pop music. It mainly consisted of fusions of American rock from the early 1960s (such as twist) and British beat music. Concha Velasco, a singer and film star, launched the scene with her 1965 single "La Chica Ye-Yé", though there had been earlier popular singles by female singers like Karina (1963).  The earliest Spanish pop was an imitation of French pop, which at the time was itself an imitation of American and British pop and rock. Flamenco rhythms, such as in  1965 single "Flamenco", sometimes made Spanish pop distinctive.

Popular music in Spain

Although Spanish pop music is currently flourishing, the industry suffered for many years under Francisco Franco's regime (1939–1975), with few outlets for Spanish performers. Regardless, American and British music, especially rock and roll, had a profound impact on Spanish audiences and musicians. The Benidorm International Song Festival, founded in 1959 in Benidorm, became an early venue where musicians could perform contemporary music for Spanish audiences. Inspired by the Italian San Remo Music Festival, this festival was followed by a wave of similar music festivals in places like Barcelona, Majorca and the Canary Islands. Many of the Spanish pop stars of the era rose to fame through these music festivals.  An injured Real Madrid football player-turned-singer, for example, became the world-famous Julio Iglesias.

During the 1960s and early 1970s, tourism boomed, bringing yet more musical styles from the rest of the continent and abroad. However, it wasn't until the 1980s that Spain's burgeoning pop music industry took off with a cultural movement known as La Movida Madrileña. Once derivative of Anglo-American musical trends, contemporary Spanish pop began developing its own original music, encompassing all contemporary popular genres, from electronica and Euro disco, to homegrown blues, rock, punk, ska, reggae, hip-hop and others. Artists like Enrique Iglesias and Alejandro Sanz have become successful internationally, selling millions of albums worldwide and winning major music awards such as the Grammy Award. As Spanish is commonly spoken in Spain and most of Latin America, music from both regions have been able to crossover with each other. According to the Sociedad General de Autores y Editores (SGAE), Spain is the largest Latino music market in the world. As a result, the Latin music industry encompasses Spanish-language music from Spain. The Latin Academy of Recording Arts & Sciences, the organization responsible for the Latin Grammy Awards, includes music from Spain including a category for Best Flamenco Album with voting members living in the country. Spanish singer Julio Iglesias holds the world record for being the best-selling Male Latin Artist of all time.

Music by region
The regions of Spain have distinctive musical traditions.  There is also a movement of singer-songwriters with politically active lyrics, paralleling similar developments in Latin America and Portugal. The singer and composer Eliseo Parra (b 1949) has recorded traditional folk music from the Basque country and Castile as well as his own compositions inspired from the musical styles of Spain and abroad.

Andalusia

Though Andalusia is best known for flamenco music, there is also a tradition of gaita rociera (tabor pipe) music in western Andalusia and a distinct violin and plucked-string type of band music known as panda de verdiales in Málaga.

Sevillanas is related to flamenco and most flamenco performers have at least one classic sevillana in their repertoire. The style originated as a medieval Castilian dance, called the seguidilla, which was adopted with a flamenco style in the 19th century. Today, this lively couples' dance is popular in most parts of Spain, though the dance is often associated with the city of Seville's famous Easter feria.

Catalan Kiko Veneno and Joaquín Sabina are popular performers in a distinctly Spanish-style rock music, while Sephardic musicians like Aurora Moreno, Luís Delgado and Rosa Zaragoza keep Andalusian Sephardic music alive.

Aragon

Jota, popular across Spain, might have its historical roots in the southern part of Aragon. Jota instruments include the castanets, guitar, bandurria, tambourines and sometimes the flute. The guitarro, a unique kind of small guitar also seen in Murcia, seems Aragonese in origin. Besides its music for stick-dances and dulzaina (shawm), Aragon has its own gaita de boto (bagpipes) and chiflo (tabor pipe). As in the Basque country, Aragonese chiflo can be played along to a chicotén string-drum (psaltery) rhythm.

Asturias, Cantabria and Galicia

Northwest Spain (Asturias, Galicia and Cantabria) is home to a distinct musical tradition extending back into the Middle Ages. The signature instrument of the region is the gaita (bagpipe). The gaita is often accompanied by a snare drum, called the tamboril, and is played in processional marches. Other instruments include the requinta, a kind of fife, as well as harps, fiddles, rebec and zanfona (hurdy-gurdy). The music itself runs the gamut from uptempo muiñeiras to stately marches. As in the Basque Country, Cantabrian music also features intricate arch and stick dances but the tabor pipe does not play as an important role as it does in Basque music. Traditionally, Galician music included a type of chanting song known as alalas. Alalas may include instrumental interludes, and were believed to have a very long history, based on legends.

There are local festivals of which Ortigueira's Festival del Mundo Celta is especially important. Drum and bagpipe couples range among the most beloved kinds of Galician music, that also includes popular bands like Milladoiro. Pandereteiras are traditional groups of women that play tambourines and sing - bands like Tanxugueiras are directly influenced by this tradition.  The bagpipe virtuosos Carlos Núñez and Susana Seivane are especially popular performers.

Asturias is also home to popular musicians such as José Ángel Hevia (bagpiper) and the group Llan de cubel. Circular dances using a 6/8 tambourine rhythm are a hallmark of this area. Vocal asturianadas show melismatic ornamentations similar to those of other parts of the Iberian Peninsula. There are many festivals, such as "Folixa na Primavera" (April, in Mieres), "Intercelticu d'Avilés" (Interceltic festival of Avilés, in July), as well as many "Celtic nights" in Asturias.

Balearic Islands

In the Balearic Islands, Xeremiers or colla de xeremiers are a traditional ensemble that consists of flabiol (a five-hole tabor pipe) and xeremias (bagpipes). Majorca's Maria del Mar Bonet was one of the most influential artists of nova canço, known for her political and social lyrics. Tomeu Penya, Biel Majoral, Cerebros Exprimidos and Joan Bibiloni are also popular.

Basque Country

The most popular kind of Basque music is named after the dance trikitixa, which is based on the accordion and tambourine. Popular performers are Joseba Tapia and Kepa Junkera. Highly appreciated folk instruments are the txistu (a tabor pipe similar to Occitanian galoubet recorder), alboka (a double clarinet played in circular-breathing technique, similar to other Mediterranean instruments like launeddas) and txalaparta (a huge xylophone, similar to the Romanian toacă and played by two performers in a fascinating game-performance). As in many parts of the Iberian peninsula, there are ritual dances with sticks, swords and arches made from vegetation. Other popular dances are the fandango, jota and 5/8 zortziko.

Basques on both sides of the Spanish-French border have been known for their singing since the Middle Ages, and a surge of Basque nationalism at the end of the 19th century led to the establishment of large Basque-language choirs that helped preserve their language and songs. Even during the persecution of the Francisco Franco era (1939–1975), when the Basque language was outlawed, traditional songs and dances were defiantly preserved in secret, and they continue to thrive despite the popularity of commercially marketed pop music.

Canary Islands

In the Canary Islands, Isa, a local kind of Jota, is now popular, and Latin American musical (Cuban) influences are quite widespread, especially with the charango (a kind of guitar). Timple, a local instrument which resembles ukulele / cavaquinho, is commonly seen in plucked-string bands.  A popular set on El Hierro island consists of drums and wooden fifes (pito herreño). The tabor pipe is customary in some ritual dances on the island of Tenerife.

Castile, Madrid and León

A large inland region, Castile, Madrid and Leon were Celtiberian country before its annexation and cultural latinization by the Roman Empire but it is extremely doubtful that anything from the musical traditions of the Celtic era have survived. Ever since, the area has been a musical melting pot; including Roman, Visigothic, Jewish, Moorish, Italian, French and Roma influences, but the longstanding influences from the surrounding regions and Portugal continue to play an important role. Areas within Castile and León generally tend to have more musical affinity with neighboring regions than with more distant parts of the region. This has given the region diverse musical traditions.

Jota is popular, but is uniquely slow in Castile and León, unlike its more energetic Aragonese version. Instrumentation also varies much from the one in Aragon.  Northern León, that shares a language relationship with a region in northern Portugal and the Spanish regions of Asturias and Galicia, also shares their musical influences. Here, the gaita (bagpipe) and tabor pipe playing traditions are prominent. In most of Castile, there is a strong tradition of dance music for dulzaina (shawm) and rondalla groups. Popular rhythms include 5/8 charrada and circle dances, jota and habas verdes.  As in many other parts of the Iberian peninsula, ritual dances include paloteos (stick dances). Salamanca is known as the home of tuna, a serenade played with guitars and tambourines, mostly by students dressed in medieval clothing. Madrid is known for its chotis music, a local variation to the 19th-century schottische dance. Flamenco, although not considered native, is popular among some urbanites but is mainly confined to Madrid.

Catalonia

Though Catalonia is best known for sardana music played by a cobla, there are other traditional styles of dance music like ball de bastons (stick-dances), galops, ball de gitanes. Music is at the forefront in cercaviles and celebrations similar to Patum in Berga. Flabiol (a five-hole tabor pipe), gralla or dolçaina (a shawm) and sac de gemecs (a local bagpipe) are traditional folk instruments that make part of some coblas.

Catalan gipsies and Andalusian immigrants to Catalonia created their own style of rumba called rumba catalana which is a popular style that's similar to flamenco, but not technically part of the flamenco canon. The rumba catalana originated in Barcelona when the rumba and other Afro-Cuban styles arrived from Cuba in the 19th and early 20th centuries. Catalan performers adapted them to the flamenco format and made it their own. Though often dismissed by aficionados as "fake" flamenco, rumba catalana remains wildly popular to this day.

The havaneres singers remain popular. Nowadays, young people cultivate Rock català popular music, as some years ago the Nova Cançó was relevant.

Extremadura

Having long been the poorest part of Spain, Extremadura is a largely rural region known for the Portuguese influence on its music. As in the northern regions of Spain, there is a rich repertoire for tabor pipe music. The zambomba friction-drum (similar to Portuguese sarronca or Brazilian cuica) is played by pulling on a rope which is inside the drum. It is found throughout Spain. The jota is common, here played with triangles, castanets, guitars, tambourines, accordions and zambombas.

Murcia

Murcia is a region in the south-east of Spain which, historically, experienced considerable Moorish colonisation, is similar in many respects to its neighbour, Andalusia. The guitar-accompanied cante jondo Flamenco style is especially associated with Murcia as are rondallas, plucked-string bands. Christian songs, such as the polyphonic chant of the Auroro singers, are traditionally sung a cappella, sometimes accompanied by the sound of church bells, and cuadrillas are festive songs primarily played during holidays, like Christmas.

Navarre and La Rioja

Navarre and La Rioja are small northern regions with diverse cultural elements.  Northern Navarre is Basque in language, while the Southern section shares more Aragonese features. The jota is also known in both Navarre and La Rioja. Both regions have rich dance and dulzaina (shawm) traditions. Txistu (tabor pipe) and dulzaina ensembles are very popular in the public celebrations of Navarre.

Valencia

Traditional music from Valencia is characteristically Mediterranean in origin. Valencia also has its local kind of Jota. Moreover, Valencia has a high reputation for musical innovation, and performing brass bands called bandes are common, with one appearing in almost every town. Dolçaina (shawm) is widely found. Valencia also shares some traditional dances with other Iberian areas, like for instance, the ball de bastons (stick-dances).
The group Al Tall is also well-known, experimenting with the Berber band Muluk El Hwa, and revitalizing traditional Valencian music, following the Riproposta Italian musical movement.

References

Fairley, Jan "A Wild, Savage Feeling". 2000.  In Broughton, Simon and Ellingham, Mark with McConnachie, James and Duane, Orla (Ed.), World Music, Vol. 1: Africa, Europe and the Middle East, pp 279–291. Rough Guides Ltd, Penguin Books. 
Fairley, Jan with Manuel Domínguez. "A Tale of Celts and Islanders". 2000.  In Broughton, Simon and Ellingham, Mark with McConnachie, James and Duane, Orla (Ed.), World Music, Vol. 1: Africa, Europe and the Middle East, pp 292–297. Rough Guides Ltd, Penguin Books. 
Alan Lomax: Mirades Miradas Glances. Photos and CD by Alan Lomax, ed. by Antoni Pizà (Barcelona: Lunwerg / Fundacio Sa Nostra, 2006) 
 Historia de la Música en España e Hispanoamérica. ed. by Maricarmen Gómez, Alvaro Torrente, Máximo Leza, Consuelo Carredano, Alberto González, Victoria Eli (Madrid-México DF, 2009–2017)

External links
  Audio clips: Traditional music of Spain. Musée d'ethnographie de Genève. Retrieved 25 November 2010.
 MIDI samples of traditional music from the Iberian peninsula and Extended version
AlejandroSanz4EnglishSpeakers A collection of translated songs from one of Spain's most famous singers.
Bloomingdale School of Music Piano Project: Sonidos de Espana/Music of Spain – extensive monthly features on the history of Spanish music.
Spanish language music Traditional and contemporary Spanish-language music, with genre descriptions, representative artists, CDs & audio samples.
Spanish Folk Music in Havana (Photo Album)
Encyclopedia of Spanish Music (16th to 19th centuries)

 
 
Spanish folk music